Lancaster School District may refer to:
Lancaster School District (California)
Lancaster School District (Minnesota)
Lancaster School District (South Carolina)
Lancaster Central School District, New York
School District of Lancaster, Pennsylvania
Lancaster Independent School District, Texas